Peter Ladner (born February 12, 1949) is a former Vancouver city councillor, Metro Vancouver vice-chair and business owner.

Ladner has more than 40 years of journalistic experience in print, radio and television; is the author of The Urban Food Revolution: Changing the Way We Feed Cities, published by New Society in November, 2011; and is a frequent speaker on business, food, community and sustainability issues. From 2009–2011, he was a Fellow at the Simon Fraser University Centre for Dialogue, researching, teaching and organizing public events around the theme Planning Cities as if Food Matters. He has a lifelong interest in growing food. As a city councilor, he worked with the Vancouver Food Policy Council in initiating the city’s program to add 2010 food-producing community garden plots by 2010.

Early life and education
His paternal grandfather was the founding partner of what has now merged into Borden Ladner Gervais LLP, a prominent Canadian law firm, Peter Ladner grew up in the Shaughnessy neighbourhood of Vancouver. His ascendants also originally settled and gave their name to the community of Ladner, British Columbia.

Career

Pre-politics

Ladner briefly attended the nearby St. George's School, before graduating from Shawnigan Lake School on Vancouver Island, and proceeding on to the University of British Columbia where he obtained a Bachelor of Arts in Sociology and completed one year of a Master's Degree in Urban Planning.

Ladner worked for the Vancouver Sun as a journalist for parts of two summers while attending UBC. He later worked at newspapers on Vancouver Island and was editor of the Victoria alternative weekly Monday Magazine from 1981 to 1986. He has written for The Globe and Mail, Canadian Business and Saturday Night.

Peter Ladner co-founded the weekly newspaper Business in Vancouver (BIV) in 1989 and worked as a BIV columnist until 20127. With a weekly readership of 60,000, BIV is branded as Vancouver's leading source of business news, targeted at senior decision-makers. It is responsible for several prominent recognition events including the Top 40 Under 40 awards and the Influential Women in Business awards. Business in Vancouver Media Group also publishes an online daily newsletter and numerous magazines and special publications. As publisher of BIV he was nominated for the Ernst and Young Entrepreneur of the Year Award in the Media category in 1999.

Political career
As a former member of Vancouver City Council, Ladner was a director of TransLink and vice-chair of Metro Vancouver, the Regional District. He has been vice-chair of the Metro Vancouver Sustainable Region Initiative and a member the World Urban Forum Committee. On City Council, he chaired the budget committee and was a member of committees on transportation and traffic and planning and environment. He was also a member of the Vancouver Economic Development Commission.

During his time on Vancouver City Council, Ladner was a sustainability and liveability advocate on issues such as transportation, green buildings, energy use, and waste reduction. He championed greenhouse gas reduction, setting a goal of making Vancouver carbon neutral by 2030. An avid cyclist, Ladner introduced the first motion in favour of a bike sharing program.

On June 8, 2008, Ladner won the Non-Partisan Association's mayoral nomination for the 2008 municipal election, defeating incumbent mayor Sam Sullivan in a surprise upset. He defeated Sullivan by 1,066 to 986 votes, after convincing NPA members that Sullivan would be defeated in the upcoming election. However, he was soundly defeated on November 15, 2008 by Gregor Robertson, the mayoral candidate of Vision Vancouver.

Personal life

Activism
Ladner is the chair of the David Suzuki Foundation and former chair of The Natural Step Canada board and the Leon and Thea Koerner Foundation board. He also served on the boards of the Institute for Media, Policy and Civil Society, Leadership Vancouver, the International Centre for Sustainable Cities, the University of British Columbia Alumni Association, New Media BC, the International Association of Area Business Publications, the Fraser Basin Council and the Forum for Women Entrepreneurs. He participated in the Vancouver City Planning Commission, the capital campaign committee for Vancouver Public Library and the Central Valley Greenway.

Ladner is a long-time environmentalist, healthy living enthusiast, and advocate of the smart city concept of using technology to make government more efficient and effective. He blogs occasionally about the urban food revolution at urbanfoodrevolution.com and on issues of sustainability and civic governance in Vancouver and elsewhere on his personal website.

He is a former age-group record holder in the North Shore Knee-knackering Trail run, a 50-km ultramarathon from Horseshoe Bay to Deep Cove.

Sister's death
On April 3, 2009, Peter Ladner's sister, Wendy Ladner-Beaudry, was found dead in Pacific Spirit Park, "the victim of an apparent random attack." Wendy was the co-chair of the BC Games Society and "past board member of Sports BC and chair of the KidSport Fund, a national charity set up to help low-income families participate in sport."

John Furlong (VANOC CEO) had become a close friend to Wendy and reserved a spot in the 2010 Olympics Torch Relay for the Ladner-Beaudry family.

Peter Ladner stated that, despite the tragedy of his sister's murder, Vancouver remains a safe city to live in. In a public statement, Ladner stressed that: "Our family, all of us, pledge to work diligently with the police, the neighbours and the wider community to bring this killer to justice and establish the safety of our entire community."

References

External links
City Website
PeterLadner.ca
Vancouver Non Partisan Association

1949 births
Living people
Businesspeople from Vancouver
Non-Partisan Association councillors
University of British Columbia alumni
Canadian journalists
Canadian political writers
Canadian bloggers
St. George's School (Vancouver) alumni
Writers from Vancouver
Place of birth missing (living people)
Shawnigan Lake School alumni